Julija Ona Vysniauskas (born 21 August 1981, Cochrane, Alberta) is a Canadian dressage rider. She competed at the 2006 FEI World Equestrian Games representing Lithuania as first Lithuanian dressage rider in history at the World Equestrian Games with her horse Syntax. Julija is a Canadian-born athlete of Lithuanian descent. She competed under the Canadian flag till 2003 but changed her sport nationality in to Lithuanian. In 2017 she decided to compete back under the Canadian flag.  In 2018 she won the Grand Prix and Grand Prix Special during the CDI Calgary.

References

1981 births
Living people
Lithuanian equestrians
Lithuanian dressage riders
Canadian dressage riders
Canadian equestrians